Mohun may refer to:

Institutions
Mohun Bagan AC an Indian sports club famous for its football team
Mohun Bagan Ground a sports ground used by that club
Mohun (surname)